Robin Gomez (born October 15, 1981 in Prince Rupert, British Columbia) is a Canadian former professional ice hockey player. He most recently played for the Bloomington PrairieThunder of the now defunct International Hockey League.

Playing career
Gomez began his career playing junior level hockey for the Calgary Hitmen in the WHL.  Gomez played two full seasons for the Hitmen, clocking up 121 games in the process.  He would start the 2001/02 season as a Calgary player but would almost immediately transfer to another WHL team, the Seattle Thunderbirds, where he would manage a ratio of a point every other game through the rest of the season.

Gomez' senior career would begin in the ECHL when he signed for the South Carolina Stingrays.  He would prove to be a good signing for the Stingrays, and would provide a more physical approach to the game as well as a solid points production.  Gomez stayed with the Stingrays for two full seasons, as well as a number of post-season appearances before moving to the higher AHL level for the beginning of the 2004/05 term, when he would line up as a Worcester Ice Cats player.

Unfortunately for Gomez, he managed just 12 games for the Ice Cats, scoring just one point in that time.  Due to his poor points output, he would return to familiar territory with the Stingrays and the ECHL.  Gomez would again prove his quality at this level, with his points total rising again, as well as clocking up large numbers of penalty minutes.

Gomez would again try his hand in the AHL in 2004/05, this time with the Hershey Bears.  Again it would only be a short spell, this time lasting only three games.  Gomez failed to score a single point in the time, but totalled an average of almost 10 penalty minutes a game.

For the 2006/07 season, Gomez would make a drastic change and moved to Europe to sign for EIHL club the Manchester Phoenix and player/coach Tony Hand. Whilst in Manchester he would again play alongside former South Carolina Stingrays team-mate Scott Basiuk.

In his 33-game spell with the Phoenix, Gomez managed 19 points and more than 150 penalty minutes.  Despite his impressive performances, Gomez returned to North America and the ECHL mid-season when he became a Victoria Salmon Kings player.
Gomez impressed in the 19 regular and 3 post-season games he played in, and was re-signed in the post season to keep him in Victoria for the 2007/08 term.

Assault charge
Gomez was charged with assault for throwing Las Vegas Wranglers player Chris Ferraro to the ice on March 1, 2008. After getting a concussion from hitting his head on the ice, Ferraro was unable to play for the next three months, returning in Game 4 of the Kelly Cup Finals.  Gomez was also suspended for the remainder of the ECHL season.

Career statistics

References

External links
 

1981 births
Living people
Bloomington PrairieThunder players
Calgary Hitmen players
Canadian expatriate ice hockey players in England
Canadian expatriate ice hockey players in the United States
Canadian ice hockey left wingers
Hershey Bears players
Ice hockey people from British Columbia
Manchester Phoenix players
Oklahoma City Blazers (1992–2009) players
People from Prince Rupert, British Columbia
Seattle Thunderbirds players
South Carolina Stingrays players
Victoria Salmon Kings players
Worcester IceCats players